Dorogusha is a rural locality (a village) in Nikolotorzhskoye Rural Settlement, Kirillovsky District, Vologda Oblast, Russia. The population was 10 as of 2002.

Geography 
Dorogusha is located 34 km northeast of Kirillov (the district's administrative centre) by road. Bolshoye Korovino is the nearest rural locality.

References 

Rural localities in Kirillovsky District